Indo-American College, is a general degree college located in Cheyyar, Tamil Nadu. It was established in the year 1998. The college is affiliated with Thiruvalluvar University. This college offers different courses in arts, commerce and science.

Departments

Science
Physics
Mathematics
Chemistry
Microbiology
Biochemistry
Bioinformatics
Computer Applications
Computer Science

Arts and commerce
English
Business Administration
Commerce
Corporate Secretaryship

Accreditation
The college is  recognized by the University Grants Commission (UGC). The college has been recognised under 12(B) and 2(f) of UGC Act.

References

External links

Educational institutions established in 1998
1998 establishments in Tamil Nadu
Colleges affiliated to Thiruvalluvar University
Academic institutions formerly affiliated with the University of Madras